Leslie Cripps is a Canadian rugby union player and former captain of the national team. A national team representative for over a decade, Cripps is considered one of the top ten North American women rugby union players.

Rugby Career 
Cripp's rugby career started after graduating high school in the summer with the Williams Lake Rugby Club. She then played with the University of Victoria Valkaries (1996-1999), the Velox and the James Bay AA in Victoria, B.C.

Cripps' first international appearance was on the Canadian U23 team in 2000 against the United States. A year later, Cripps also played against the Americans for her cap for the national seniors team. Cripps made 47 international appearances between 2001 and 2010. The represented  at the 2002, 2006, and 2010 Women's Rugby World Cup. 

In 2001, she joined Saracens in London, England where she received "New Player of the Year" award. After several years with the Saracens, Cripps captained the club for two years and won five league titles.

Awards and recognition 

 2003, Worlds 15s team, selection
 2008, Nomads (Barbarians select side), selection (captain)
 2019, BC Rugby Hall of Fame inductee
 2020, Rugby Canada Hall of Fame inductee

References

Living people
Canadian female rugby union players
Canada women's international rugby union players
1977 births